Oliver Held (born 10 September 1972) is a German former professional footballer who played as a midfielder.

Honours
 UEFA Cup: 1996–97
 DFB-Pokal: 2000–01
 Bundesliga runner-up: 2000–01

References

External links

 

1972 births
Living people
Sportspeople from Kiel
German footballers
Footballers from Schleswig-Holstein
Association football midfielders
UEFA Cup winning players
Bundesliga players
2. Bundesliga players
Holstein Kiel players
FC Schalke 04 players
FC St. Pauli players
German football managers
West German footballers